Wayne Pascoe (born 19 April 1955) is a former professional tennis player from Australia.

Biography
A right-handed player from Adelaide, Pascoe began competing on tour in the late 1970s.

As a singles player on the Grand Prix circuit he had a win over Bill Scanlon at the Melbourne Indoor in 1980 and had his best run at the 1981 South Australian Open, where he made the quarter-finals in front of a home crowd.

During his career he featured in the main draws of the Australian Open, Wimbledon Championships and US Open. He reached the second round of the 1981 Wimbledon Championships as a qualifier, with a first round win over Pascal Portes. His best performances at Wimbledon came in doubles, twice making the round of 16, with John Fitzgerald in 1981 and David Mustard in 1982.

Pascoe, a property adviser by profession, has served on the board of Tennis NSW since 2011 and was appointed president in 2018.

Challenger titles

Doubles: (1)

References

External links
 
 

1955 births
Living people
Australian male tennis players
Tennis players from Adelaide
Australian sports executives and administrators
Tennis executives